Çelikköy is a village in the Gölbaşı District, Adıyaman Province, Turkey. The village is populated by Turks and had a population of 357 in 2021. Both Alevis and Sunni Muslims are present in the village.

The hamlet of Durak is attached to the village.

References

Villages in Gölbaşı District, Adıyaman Province